Nevada's 1st Senate district is one of 21 districts in the Nevada Senate. It has been represented by Democrat Pat Spearman since 2012.

Geography and demographics
District 1 is located just north of Las Vegas in Clark County, including much of North Las Vegas and smaller sections of Sunrise Manor and Las Vegas itself.

The district is entirely located within Nevada's 4th congressional district, and overlaps with the 1st and 17th districts of the Nevada Assembly.

According to the 2010 Census, the district had a population of 128,861 – 0.2% below the ideal – which has since increased. Compared to other districts in the Senate, District 1 has the third smallest solely white population and the largest population of African Americans. The district has a younger population than average with nearly 65% of the population below the age of 40. The median household income in the district is almost $10,000 above the Nevada average, while the poverty rate is 10.5%.

Recent election results
Nevada Senators are elected to staggered four-year terms; since 2012 redistricting, the 1st district has held elections in presidential years.

2020

2016
In 2016, Spearman faced entrepreneur and political newcomer Arsen Ter-Petrosyan. Neither faced opponents in their respective primaries. Spearman won the election with over 65% of the vote.

2012
In the 2012 Democratic primary, two-term incumbent John Jay Lee was challenged by veteran and former evangelical minister Pat Spearman. Spearman, who is LGBT, had never previously held political office and argued that the district needed a "real Democrat." Lee, a Mormon who opposed gay marriage, said he wasn't worried by Spearman, as he thought Spearman had been "encouraged to run by supporters of single issues like gay rights." Spearman won the primary with 63% of the vote.

No Republican filed for the seat, and Spearman's lone opponent was Gregory Hughes, a member of the Independent American Party, whom she defeated easily.

Federal and statewide results in District 1

History 
District 1 was created when the senatorial districts were redrawn in 2011 as a result of the 2010 Census. The new districts went into effect on January 1, 2012 for filing for office, and for nominating and electing senators. They became effective for all other purposes on November 7 of the same year – the day after Election Day, when the new terms began. The law defines the borders District 1 using census tracts, block groups, and blocks. Since its creation, two elections have been held in the district. Most of the district was previously in the districts Clark County 1 and Clark County 12.

Clark County District 1
From the 1960s to the 1980s, the district was based along the Colorado River and Henderson, which are now the 12th and 5th districts respectively. In the 1990s, it consisted of all Clark County outside of the Las Vegas Valley, including Indian Springs, Boulder City, Sandy Valley, and Mesquite.

List of representatives

References

External links 
 
 

1
Clark County, Nevada